Chintaman Vanaga (1 June 1950 – 30 January 2018) was an Indian politician and Adivasi leader from Maharashtra and was a member of the Bharatiya Janata Party. He was member of 16th Lok Sabha elected from Palghar (Lok Sabha constituency) alongside being a two-time Member of Parliament (India) from Dahanu (Lok Sabha Constituency).

He was an advocate by qualification from University of Mumbai and served as the President of BJP's Thane district office from 1990 to 1996. He died on January 30, 2018, of a heart attack.

State politics
In 2009, Vanaga became a member of Legislative Assembly of Maharashtra representing Vikramgad.

National politics
Vanaga was elected to the 11th Lok Sabha in 1996 and 13th Lok Sabha in 1999 from the Dahanu. In the 2014 election he was elected to represent Palghar in the 16th Lok Sabha.

References

|-

|-

1956 births
2018 deaths
People from Thane district
University of Mumbai alumni
Bharatiya Janata Party politicians from Maharashtra
Maharashtra MLAs 2009–2014
Marathi politicians
India MPs 2014–2019
India MPs 1996–1997
India MPs 1999–2004
Lok Sabha members from Maharashtra
People from Palghar district
People from Palghar